"How it happened" is a 1506-word short story by the author Sir Arthur Ignatius Conan Doyle first published during the First World War at the end of what may be considered to be the Edwardian era in 1918 but Conan Doyle began writing in the Victorian era. This story is considered to be about willful masculine pride, and could also be recognized as a warning about the perils of driving at night and in an unfamiliar vehicle.

The story is written in the first person; the narrator is a man who is met at the beginning of the story by his chauffeur, Perkins, at half-past eleven at the "little country station" while coming back from London. He wanted to try his new car, which had been delivered that day. He was warned that the gears were not of the same type he is used to but he insisted on driving. They "were just over the brow of" Claystall Hill, "one of the worst hills of England", when he lost all control on the speed of the car. He tried to bring the car back to his house "wheels whirring like a high wind" and did not jump even when advised to do so by Perkins. In the end, he managed to reach home but crashed into the park gate. The story ends with Perkins having injured his leg and the narrator meeting a dead friend, Stanley, who tells him that he himself died in the accident.

A central theme in this story is loyalty and companionship; the chauffeur, Perkins, offers to take control of the car, which would have allowed the narrator to escape the vehicle. However, the narrator refuses to leave his chauffeur behind and remains in the car until the end, even offering to take the wheel himself and allow Perkins to jump.

References

External links
 

1918 short stories
Short stories by Arthur Conan Doyle